Stephen Moreo he is the Bishop of Johannesburg since 2013.

Moreo is from North West Province and studied for the priesthood at St Paul's Anglican seminary, Grahamstown. He was ordained deacon in 1984 and priest in 1985. His first post was at Ikageng. After that, he held  incumbencies in Soweto.

Notes

Year of birth missing (living people)
Living people
Anglican bishops of Johannesburg